The Brazil women's national under-18 volleyball team represents Brazil in international women's volleyball competitions and friendly matches under the age 18 and it is ruled by the Brazilian Volleyball Federation that is a member of South American volleyball body Confederación Sudamericana de Voleibol (CSV) and the international volleyball body government the Fédération Internationale de Volleyball (FIVB).

Results

U18 World Championship
 Champions   Runners up   Third place   Fourth place

U17 South America Championship
 Champions   Runners up   Third place   Fourth place

Team

Current squad
The following is the Brazilian roster in the 2015 FIVB Volleyball Girls' U18 World Championship.

Head Coach: Luizomar de Moura

Former squads

U18 World Championship
2005 –  Gold medal
Camila Monteiro, Erica Adachi, Martina Roese, Nicole Silva, Betina Schmidt (c), Silvana Papini, Priscila Daroit, Natalia Pereira, Amanda Francisco, Renata Maggioni, Maria de Lourdes Silva and Tandara Caixeta
2007 – 5th place
Ivna Marra, Patricia Stasiak, Rafaella Ponte, Leticia Raymundi (c), Ana Beatriz Correa, Ohana Moraes, Rosane Maggioni, Roberta Ratzke, Aline Lebioda, Rupia Furtado, Diana Silva and Glauciele Silva
2009 –  Gold medal
Rosane Maggioni (c), Sthefanie Paulino, Francynne Jacintho, Carolina Freitas, Eduarda Kraisch, Isabela Paquiardi, Ana Beatriz Correa, Samara Almeida, Priscila Heldes, Gabriella Souza, Sâmera Alcides and Carla Santos
2011 – 6th place
Isabella Batista, Naiane Rios, Natália Silva, Carla Reginatto, Gabriela Guimarães, Rosamaria Montibeller, Valquiria Dullius, Paula Mohr, Juliana Filipelli, Raquel Oliveira (c), Stephanie Correa and Nayara Araújo
2013 –  Bronze medal
Drussyla Costa (c), Lana Conceição, Amanda Brock, Mariana Dias, Laiza Ferreira, Gabriela Candido, Gabriela Silva, Karoline Tormena, Lorenne Teixeira, Thais Oliveira, Lais Vasques and Marina Sanches
2015 – 11th place
Diana Alecrim, Jackeline Santos, Cassia Rauber, Amanda Sehn (c), Lorrayna da Silva, Beatriz Carvalho, Eduarda Cavatão, Karina Souza, Ana Beatriz Franklin, Lorena Viezel, Gabriella Silva and Nyeme Costa
2017 – 10th place
Julia Bergmann, Larissa Besen, Maria Clara Cavalcante, Rosely Nogueira, Daniela Seibt, Beatriz Santana, Lanna Machado, Sabrina Groth, Daniela Cechetto, Kenya Malachias (c), Mariana Brambilla and Tainara Santos
2019 –  Bronze medal
Istefani Silva, Marcelle da Silva, Ana Cecilia Lopes, Stephany Morete (c), Ana Cristina de Souza, Livia Lima, Julia Kudiess, Maria Clara Carvalhaes, Carolina Santos, Katia Silva, Ana Luiza Rüdiger and Letícia Moura

See also
 Brazil men's national under-19 volleyball team
 Brazil women's national volleyball team
 Brazil women's national under-23 volleyball team
 Brazil women's national under-20 volleyball team

References

External links
 Official website 

National women's under-18 volleyball teams
Volleyball in Brazil
Volleyball